Huaqiang North station is a station of Shenzhen Metro Line 2 and Line 7. Line 2 platforms opened on 28 June 2011 and Line 7 platforms opened on 28 October 2016.  It serves the shopping district of Huaqiangbei.

Station layout

Exits

See also
 Huaqiangbei

References

External links
 Shenzhen Metro Huaqiang North Station (Line 2) (Chinese)
 Shenzhen Metro Huaqiang North Station (Line 2) (English)
 Shenzhen Metro Huaqiang North Station (Line 7) (Chinese)
 Shenzhen Metro Huaqiang North Station (Line 7) (English)

Shenzhen Metro stations
Railway stations in Guangdong
Futian District
Railway stations in China opened in 2011